The Four Seasons is an American rock and pop band formed in 1960 in Newark, New Jersey. Since 1970, they have also been known at times as Frankie Valli and the Four Seasons. The band evolved out of a previous band called The Four Lovers, with Frankie Valli as the lead singer, Bob Gaudio on keyboards and tenor vocals, Tommy DeVito on lead guitar and baritone vocals, and Nick Massi on bass guitar and bass vocals. On nearly all of their 1960s hits, they were credited as The 4 Seasons.

The legal name of the organization is the Four Seasons Partnership, formed by Gaudio and Valli, and was taken after a failed audition in 1960. While band members have come and gone, Gaudio and Valli remain the band's constants, with each owning 50% of the act and its assets, including virtually all of its recording catalog. Gaudio no longer plays live, leaving Valli as the only original member of the band who still tours .

The band's original line-up was inducted into the Rock and Roll Hall of Fame in 1990, and joined the Vocal Group Hall of Fame in 1999. They are one of the best-selling musical groups of all time, having sold an estimated 100 million records worldwide.

History

Before the Four Seasons

Frankie Valli's first commercial release was "My Mother's Eyes" (as Frankie Valley) in 1953. The following year, he and guitarist Tommy DeVito formed The Variatones (with Hank Majewski, rhythm guitar, Frank Cottone, accordion, and Billy Thompson, drums), which between 1954 and 1956 performed and recorded under a variety of names before settling on the name The Four Lovers. The same year, the quartet released their first record, Otis Blackwell's "You're the Apple of My Eye", which appeared on the Billboard Top 100 singles chart, peaking at #62. Five more Four Lovers singles (on RCA Victor) were released over the next year, with virtually no sales, airplay, or jukebox play. In 1957, the band's seventh single (this time on Epic) had a similar lack of success.

From 1956 until 1958, the group stayed together, performing in clubs and lounges as The Four Lovers and recording on music labels under various names: Frankie Tyler, Frankie Valli, Frankie Valli and the Travelers, Frankie Valli and the Romans, the Village Voices, and the Topics are some of the 18 "stage names" used individually or collectively by the members of the band. In 1958, Charles Calello replaced Nick Massi on bass in the lineup.

In 1959, the band started working with producer/songwriter Bob Crewe, primarily for session work (Crewe wrote "I Go Ape", which Valli recorded with the intention of releasing it as a "solo" single, only to be beaten to the punch by an unrelated song of the same name from Neil Sedaka, who became friends with Valli later on). Later that year, The Four Lovers were performing in Baltimore on the same stage as the Royal Teens, who were riding the wave of success of "Short Shorts", a song co-written by then-15-year-old Bob Gaudio, who was also the Royal Teens' keyboardist. In late 1959, Gaudio was added to The Four Lovers on keyboards and guitar, as a replacement for rhythm guitarist Hank Majewski. Early the following year, Nick Massi returned to replace Calello, who remained the band's musical arranger.

In 1960, despite the changes of personnel, the fortunes of The Four Lovers had not changed—they failed an audition for a lounge at a Union Township, Union County, New Jersey bowling establishment. According to Gaudio, "We figured we'll come out of this with something. So we took the name of the bowling alley. It was called the Four Seasons." Despite the last few years of frustration of The Four Lovers, this proved to be the turning point for the band. Later, on a handshake agreement between keyboardist/composer Bob Gaudio and lead singer Frankie Valli, the Four Seasons Partnership was formed.

Rise
The Four Seasons signed as artists to Crewe's production company, and they released their first Crewe-produced single under their new name in 1961 ("Bermuda"/"Spanish Lace" on Gone Records). The single did not chart. The band continued working with producer Bob Crewe as background vocalists and sometimes leads under different names, for productions on Crewe's own Topix label. As a follow-up, Bob Gaudio wrote a song that, after some discussion between Crewe and Gaudio, was titled "Sherry". After the song was recorded, Crewe and the members of the band solicited record labels to release it. It was Frankie Valli who spoke with Randy Wood, West Coast sales manager for Vee-Jay Records (not the founder of Dot Records) who, in turn, suggested the release of "Sherry" to the decision-makers at Vee-Jay. "Sherry" made enough of an impression that Crewe was able to sign a deal between his production company and Vee-Jay for its release. They were the first white artists to sign with Vee-Jay.

In 1962, the band released their first album, featuring the single "Sherry", which was not only their first charted hit but also their first number-one song. Under the guidance of Bob Crewe, the Four Seasons followed up "Sherry" with several million-selling singles, generally composed by Crewe and Gaudio, including "Big Girls Don't Cry" (their second #1 hit), "Walk Like a Man" (their third #1), "Candy Girl" (written by Larry Santos), "Ain't That a Shame", and several others. Also, they released a Christmas album in December 1962 and charted with a unique rendition of "Santa Claus Is Coming to Town".

From 1962 to early 1964, the Beach Boys were the only band to match the Four Seasons in record sales in the United States, and their first three Vee-Jay non-holiday single releases (i.e., ignoring their version of "Santa Claus Is Coming to Town") marked the first time that a rock band hit #1 on the Billboard singles charts with three consecutive entries.

In 1962, they were invited to perform their hit "Big Girls Don't Cry" on the show American Bandstand.

From Vee-Jay to Philips
Despite the band's success, Vee-Jay Records was in financial distress. The label had released several early Beatles singles in America. When the Beatles became hugely popular, Vee-Jay was swamped with orders, and they shipped more than two million Beatles records in a single month. The demands of mass production, the cash-flow problems involved, and the loss of the Beatles when Trans-Global (a firm licensed by EMI to distribute its products) canceled Vee-Jay's contract on August 3, 1963, due to non-payment of royalties, found Vee-Jay hard-pressed to stay afloat. Vee-Jay continued to produce one Beatles album (in various forms) in defiance of the cancellation. After over a year of legal negotiations, Capitol Records was finally able to stop Vee-Jay, effective October 15, 1964.

While the label went through internal turmoil with the Beatles and Capitol Records, a separate royalty dispute between Vee-Jay and the Four Seasons headed to court. In January 1964, after several successful albums but a lack of money from Vee-Jay, the Seasons left Vee-Jay and moved to Philips Records, then a division of Mercury Records. In the 1965 settlement of the lawsuit, Vee-Jay retained release rights for all material the band recorded for the label. Vee-Jay exercised those rights liberally over the following year. The group was obligated to deliver one final album to Vee-Jay, which they did in the form of a "faux" live LP. (When Vee-Jay was finally declared bankrupt in 1966, the Four Seasons' Vee-Jay catalog reverted to the band to settle unpaid royalties, and the tracks were then reissued by Philips.)

The change of label did not diminish the popularity of the Four Seasons in 1964, nor did the onslaught of the British Invasion and Beatlemania. However, "Dawn (Go Away)" was kept from the #1 spot on the Hot 100 by no fewer than three Beatles singles in the March 21, 1964, edition (two weeks later, the top five slots were filled by Beatles singles). In a two-record set dubbed The Beatles vs the Four Seasons: The International Battle of the Century!, Vee-Jay created an elaborate two-disc package that the purchaser could use to write on and score individual recordings by their favorite artist. The discs were reissues of the albums Introducing... The Beatles and Golden Hits of the Four Seasons, featuring each original album's label, title, and catalog number. Today, this album package is a collector's item.

One band, several acts
Nick Massi left the Four Seasons in September 1965. The band's arranger, Charles Calello (a former member of The Four Lovers), stepped in as a temporary replacement. A few months later, Joe Long was permanently hired and became a mainstay of the band on bass and backing vocals until 1975, with Calello returning to arranging. In the meantime, the Four Seasons released recordings under a variety of names, including the Valli Boys, the Wonder Who?, and Frankie Valli. Every Valli "solo" recording from 1965 to "My Eyes Adored You" in 1974 was recorded by the Four Seasons at the same time and in the same sessions as other Four Seasons material; these were usually distinguished in that material written and marketed as Valli solo numbers did not have Valli's trademark falsetto. Valli's first post-1960 single without the Seasons was 1975's "Swearin' to God".

More top 20 singles followed in 1965, 1966, and 1967, including "Let's Hang On!", "Don't Think Twice, It's All Right" (as the Wonder Who?), "Working My Way Back to You", "Opus 17 (Don't You Worry 'bout Me)", "I've Got You Under My Skin", "Can't Take My Eyes Off You" (released under Valli's name as a "solo" single), "Beggin'" (later covered by Norwegian duo Madcon and Italian band Måneskin), "Tell It to the Rain", "C'mon Marianne", and "I Make a Fool of Myself" (Frankie Valli "solo"). Also, other Crewe/Gaudio songs that did not become hits for either Valli or the Four Seasons became international hits in cover versions, such as "Silence Is Golden" (the Tremeloes) and "The Sun Ain't Gonna Shine (Anymore)" (the Walker Brothers). However, 1968's "Will You Love Me Tomorrow" was the band's last top 40 hit for seven years (reaching #24), just after Valli's last "solo" hit of the 1960s, the #29 charted "To Give (The Reason I Live)".

End of the 1960s and move to Motown
By 1969, the band's popularity had declined, with public interest moving towards rock with a harder edge and music with more socially conscious lyrics. Aware of that, Bob Gaudio partnered with folk-rock songwriter Jake Holmes to write a concept album titled The Genuine Imitation Life Gazette, which discussed contemporary issues from the band's standpoint, including divorce ("Saturday's Father"), and Kinks-style satirical looks at modern life (e.g., "American Crucifixion and Resurrection" and "Genuine Imitation Life").

The album cover was designed to resemble the front page of a newspaper, pre-dating Jethro Tull's Thick as a Brick by several years. The record was a commercial failure and led to the band's departure from Philips shortly after that, but it did catch the attention of Frank Sinatra, whose 1969 album, Watertown, involved Gaudio, Holmes, and Calello. The Seasons' last single on Philips, 1970's "Patch of Blue", featured the band's name as "Frankie Valli & the Four Seasons", but the change in billing did not revive the band's fortunes. Reverting to the "Four Seasons" billing without Valli's name upfront, the group issued a single on Crewe's eponymous label, a rendition of "And That Reminds Me", which peaked at number 45 on the Billboard chart.

After leaving Philips, the Four Seasons recorded a one-off single for the Warner Bros. label in England, "Sleeping Man", backed by "Whatever You Say", which was never released in the USA. John Stefan, the band's lead trumpeter, arranged the horn parts. Following that single, the band signed to Motown. The first LP, Chameleon, released by Motown subsidiary label MoWest Records in 1972, failed to sell. A 1971 Frankie Valli solo single on Motown, "Love Isn't Here", and three Four Seasons singles, "Walk On, Don't Look Back" on MoWest in 1972, "How Come" and "Hickory" on Motown in 1973, sank without a trace. A song from Chameleon, "The Night", later became a Northern Soul hit and reached the top 10 of the UK Singles Chart, but was not commercially released in the United States as a single, although promotional copies were distributed in 1972, showing the artist as Frankie Valli.

In late 1973 and early 1974, the Four Seasons recorded eight songs for a second Motown album, which the company refused to release, and later in 1974, the label and the band parted ways. On behalf of the Four Seasons Partnership, Valli tried to purchase the entire collection of master recordings the group had made for Motown. After hearing the amount needed to buy them all, Valli arranged to purchase "My Eyes Adored You" for $4,000. He took the tape to Larry Uttal, the owner and founder of Private Stock Records, who wanted to release it as a Frankie Valli solo single. Although the band remained unsigned in the later part of 1974, Valli had a new label—and a new solo career.

Resurgence
While new hits for the Four Seasons had dried up in the first half of the 1970s, the band never lost its popularity as a performing act. Longtime member Joe Long stayed in the group until 1975. The new lineup boasted two new lead singers in Don Ciccone (formerly of the Critters) and Gerry Polci, who eased the singing load on an ailing Frankie Valli (who was gradually losing his hearing due to otosclerosis, though eventually surgery restored most of it). As "My Eyes Adored You" climbed the Hot 100 singles chart in early 1975, Valli and Gaudio managed to get the Four Seasons signed with Warner Bros. Records as the disco era dawned. At the same time, Uttal was persuaded to release The Four Seasons Story, a two-record compilation of the band's biggest hit singles from 1962 to 1970. It quickly became a gold record, selling over one million copies before the RIAA started awarding platinum records for million-selling albums.

In 1975, record sales exploded for both Valli and the Four Seasons as both acts had million-selling singles in the United States ("My Eyes Adored You" hit #1 on the Hot 100 for Valli in March, "Who Loves You" peaked at #3 in November for the band and number 6 in the UK chart). In the United Kingdom, Tamla Motown released "The Night" as a single on the 'Mowest' label and saw it reach the #7 position on the UK Singles Chart. "My Eyes Adored You" was also a top 10 hit in the United Kingdom in February of that year. Valli had his first truly solo hit in the summer of 1975 when the Bob Crewe-produced "Swearin' to God" followed "My Eyes Adored You" into the upper reaches of the Hot 100, peaking at the #6 position and capitalizing on the growing disco craze. The song was released in three forms: the eight-minute album version, the ten-minute extended 12-inch single version, and the four-minute single version. This record featured Patti Austin on bridge vocals before she became well-known. Valli followed this with a discofied #11 hit version of Ruby & the Romantics' "Our Day Will Come", also featuring Austin.

The album Who Loves You became a surprise million-seller for the band, as it was the first Four Seasons album to prominently feature lead vocals by anyone other than Valli ("Sorry" on Half & Half had featured Gaudio, DeVito and Long minus Valli, while "Wall Street Village Day" on Genuine Imitation Life Gazette featured Valli on just a couple of 'bridge' section lead vocal lines). Gerry Polci did about half of the lead vocals, sharing them with Valli and one led by Ciccone ('Slip Away'). The title song had Valli doing the lead on the verses, but none of the trademark falsettos in the chorus. It was a top 10 British hit in October 1975, relaunching their career there.

The Four Seasons opened 1976 atop the Billboard chart with their fifth #1 single, "December, 1963 (Oh, What a Night)", co-written by Bob Gaudio and his future wife, Judy Parker. The single also hit number one in the United Kingdom. "December, 1963 (Oh, What a Night)" had Polci singing lead on the verses, Ciccone featured on specific sections, and Valli on lead vocals only on the two bridge sections and backup vocals on the chorus.

Although the band also scored minor chart placements with "Silver Star" (with Valli on harmony vocals) (#38 in 1976) and "Down the Hall" (#65 in 1977), both sung by Polci, and "Spend the Night in Love" (#91 in 1980), which again featured Polci as main lead vocalist and Valli singing the bridge section and contributing to backup group vocals, "December, 1963" marked the end of the Seasons' hit-making run. Both singles were hits in the United Kingdom, with "Silver Star" making the top 10. (A dance remix of "December, 1963" returned them briefly to the upper reaches of the Billboard singles charts almost two decades later).

After disco

The success of Who Loves You increased the popularity of the Four Seasons as a touring group and reignited recording unit, but when 1977's Helicon album was released by Warner Bros., the climate was changing again, both for the band and for Valli. The new record yielded only one USA single, "Down the Hall", which limped onto the Hot 100. In the UK they had chart hits with both "Down the Hall" and "Rhapsody" (with verses sung by Don Ciccone and Valli appearing to notable effect only as lead voice over group harmonies on the chorus). At the same time, Valli's string of solo hits had come to an end when Private Stock Records went out of business. Helicon saw Polci and Ciccone heavily featured as lead vocalists, Valli, besides his co-lead chorus vocal on "Rhapsody" and some backing vocals, only taking a brief bridge lead vocal on two songs that were sung mainly by Polci. However, on "New York Street Song (No Easy Way)", Valli also clearly stands out over the group harmonies on two notable a cappella sections. Plus, Valli took one solo lead vocal role on the album's concluding song, the brief Gaudio-Parker-penned "I Believe in You".

Excluding Valli's 1978 "Grease" single, which hit #1 while the motion picture of the same name became the highest-grossing musical in cinematic history, the last top 40 hit for the band was behind them. Both Valli and the band released singles and albums on an occasional basis, but after "Grease", only a remixed version of their biggest seller, "December 1963" would visit the upper half of the Hot 100 (in 1994). In January 1981, Warners released Frankie Valli & the Four Seasons Reunited Live. Produced by Bob Gaudio, it was a double album of concert recordings which included the two studio recordings "Spend the Night in Love" and "Heaven Must Have Sent You (Here in the Night)" sung by Valli. The latter became a UK single but failed to chart, while the former was released as a single in America, inching its way into the Hot 100.

In 1984, a long-awaited collaboration between the Four Seasons and the Beach Boys, East Meets West, was released on FBI Records, owned by the Four Seasons Partnership, which included most of the surviving Beach Boys (including Brian Wilson). However, the record did not sell well. Even after the rise and fall of the band's sales in the disco era, the Four Seasons, in one version or another (the group became a sextet as Jerry Corbetta, formerly of Sugarloaf, joined the lineup), continued to be a popular touring act, with Valli being the only constant in the midst of a fluctuating lineup. Although Gaudio is still officially part of the band (he and Valli are still equal partners in the Four Seasons Partnership), he now restricts his activities to writing, producing, and the occasional studio work. In August 1985, MCA Records released the band album Streetfighter, which yielded two singles in the title track and "Book of Love", a post-disco-style revamp of the Monotones' 1957 recording. In September 1992, a band album was released entitled Hope + Glory on the MCA/Curb label.

In 2003, Valli revamped the group and started touring with a new band of Four Seasons consisting of Landon Beard, Todd Fournier, and brothers Brian Brigham and Brandon Brigham. Beard, Fournier and the Brigham brothers performed as The Four Seasons for 15 years, longer than any other lineup and longer than any of the band's other members except Valli and Gaudio. In 2018, the Beard/Fournier/Brigham quartet spun off and began performing as The Modern Gentlemen, with Valli's blessing, and Valli recruited a new quartet of musicians to back him. The 1970s lineup of the group (Polci, Ciccone and Lee Shapiro) reunited without Valli in 2012 as The Hit Men; it toured with several other session musicians of good repute. Shapiro has continued The Hit Men as a standalone project after Ciccone died in 2016 and Polci withdrew from the group due to heart ailments.

A massive 3CD + 1DVD box set ...Jersey Beat... The Music Of Frankie Valli & the 4 Seasons was released in mid-2007, marketed as the most comprehensive collection of Four Seasons music yet. The album title Jersey Beat is a play on Jersey Boys, a successful Broadway musical about the Four Seasons, as well as on Mersey Beat, a term first coined as the title of a music magazine published in Liverpool, England, from 1961, but subsequently also used to describe Liverpool's "beat music" culture of the early 1960s.

In 2008, the Four Seasons' "Beggin'" was revived by two acts. Pilooski made an electro remix of that song, while rap act Madcon used it as the basis of their song "Beggin'". The latter reached number 5 in the UK charts and was a hit across Europe. The song was featured in a TV commercial for adidas shoes entitled "Celebrate Originality". The Adidas commercial is a popular hit on YouTube and features a house party with famous celebrities such as David Beckham, Russel Simmons, Kevin Garnett, Missy Elliott, Katy Perry, and Mark Gonzales.

As part of the BBC Proms in the Park they performed with the BBC Concert Orchestra in Hyde Park on September 10, 2016.

In 2020, the group launched a YouTube channel, featuring the group virtually re-recording some of their songs.

A limited-edition 44-disc career box set called "Working Our Way Back to You: The Ultimate Collection" was initially going to be released in the summer of 2021 by The Four Seasons Partnership and Snapper Records, but it missed the release due to the COVID-19 pandemic. However, the box set was re-scheduled for release on December 9, 2022, before the release date was pushed back to April 14, 2023. It will include every album released by the band, a CD of unreleased tracks from the band's Mowest years, three live shows taken from soundboard recordings as well as numerous other rare tracks and alternative versions.

Other names
From 1956 until "My Eyes Adored You" in 1975, records which the Four Seasons recorded had the following artist credit (a sampling):

Pre-1960
 Frankie Vall
 Frankie Valley
 Frankie Valle and the Romans
 The Four Lovers
 Frankie Tyler
 The Variatones

1960 and after
 The Four Seasons
 Hal Miller and the Rays
 Billy Dixon and the Topics
 Johnny Halo featuring the Four Seasons
 The 4 Seasons
 The Wonder Who?
 Frankie Valli
 The Valli Boys
 Frankie Valli and the Four Seasons
 The Romans
 The Village Voices

Band members
Partial credits before 1994.

Current
 Frankie Valli – vocals (1960–present)
 Robby Robinson – keyboards, musical director (1979–1996, 2004–present)
 Ronen Bay – backing vocals (2018–present)
 Craig Cady – backing vocals (2018–present)
 Aaron Alexander Gordon – backing vocals (2022–present)
 Noah Rivera – backing vocals (2020–present)
 Rick Keller – saxophone, flute, keyboards, percussion (2002–present)
 Basil Fung – guitar (2017–present)
 Andy Sanesi – drums (2018–present)
 Carmen Grillo – guitar (2021–present)
 Alfredo Lopez – bass (2021–present)

Former

 Tommy DeVito – vocals, guitar (1960–1970, died 2020)
 Bob Gaudio – vocals, keyboards, guitar (1960–1971)
 Nick Massi – vocals, bass (1960–1965, died 2000)
 Charles Calello – backing vocals, bass (1965)
 Joe Long – vocals, bass (1965–1975, died 2021)
 Bob Grimm – vocals, guitar (1970–1971)
 Demetri Callas – vocals, guitar (1971–1973, died 2020)
 Bill DeLoach – vocals, keyboards (1971–1973)
 Clay Jordan – vocals, keyboards (1971)
 Ronnie Carangelo – drums (1971)
 Richard Natoli – saxophone, horn (1972–1977, 1979–1982)
 Don Ciccone – vocals, bass, rhythm guitar (1972–1977, 1979–1982, died 2016)
 Gerry Polci – vocals, drums (1973–1977, 1979–1982, 1988–1990)
 Lee Shapiro – keyboards (1973–1981)
  – vocals, lead and rhythm guitars (1973–1977)
 Jerry Corbetta – vocals, keyboards (1979–1985)
 Larry Lingle – guitar (1979–1993, 2015)
 Rex Robinson – vocals, bass (1979–2003)
 Mike Lingle – drums (1982–1985)
 Lynn Hammann – vocals, drums (1982–1988)
 Chuck Wilson – percussion (1982–1990); drums (1990–1993)
 Robin Swenson – keyboards (1985–1991)
 Howard Larrabee – vocals, keyboards (1988–1990)
 Richie Gajate-Garcia – percussion (1990–2019)
 Tim Stone – vocals, keyboards (1991–1996?)
 Daniel "Zoro" Donelly – drums (1994–2005)
 Adrian Baker – vocals, guitar (1994–1995)
 Tommy Alvarado – saxophone, percussion (1994–1996)
 Fino Roverato – guitar (1994–2003?)
 Warren Ham – saxophone (1996–2000)
 Todd Fournier – vocals (2002–2018)
 Jason Martinez – vocals (2002–2007, 2018)
 Rich Callaci – keyboards (2003)
 Landon Beard – vocals (2003–2018)
 Brian Brigham – vocals (2003–2018)
 Keith Hubacher – bass (2004–2007, 2016–2018)
 Craig Pilo – drums (2005–2018)
 Val Martinez – vocals (2006)
 Brandon Brigham – vocals (2006–2018)
 John Schroeder – guitar (c. 2012)
 Robbie Angelucci – guitar (c. 2012)
 John Menzano – bass (c. 2012)
 Brad Sharp (2015–2016)
 Erik Bates – vocals (2018–2020)
 Joseph Ott – backing vocals (2018–2022)
 Sandro Rebel – keyboards (2018–2020)
 Wil Roberts – bass (2018–2020)
 Christian Moraga – percussion (2019–2020)
 Edwin Livingston – bass (2020)
 Jamie Kime – guitar (2020–2021)
 Steve Warren – bass (2021)

Timeline

Discography

Studio albums 
This is not a complete list of album releases. These recordings have been reissued on a variety of labels, some of which are noted here. This list includes only those Frankie Valli solo albums (the first two) that were recorded as Four Seasons productions.

Compilation and live albums
The peak position on the Billboard Top 200 albums chart follows the album title.

Selected singles

The US chart position on the Billboard Hot 100 singles chart follows the song title. Only singles that reached a position of #30 or higher on the Hot 100 are listed.

Jersey Boys

Jersey Boys, a musical play based on the lives of the Four Seasons and directed by Des McAnuff (The Who's Tommy, 700 Sundays), premiered at his La Jolla Playhouse and opened on November 6, 2005 to generally positive reviews. It subsequently won multiple Tony Awards after its move to Broadway. The original cast included John Lloyd Young as Frankie Valli, Daniel Reichard as Bob Gaudio, Christian Hoff as Tommy DeVito, and J. Robert Spencer as Nick Massi. The play portrays the history of the Four Seasons in four parts, with each part narrated by a different member of the band and supposedly reflecting that band member's perspective on the band's history. The author of the book of the play, Rick Elice, interviewed Valli, Gaudio, and DeVito in writing the play, and pieced together Nick Massi's point of view based on those interviews (Massi had died before the play was written.) The Broadway production won four 2006 Tony Awards, including Best Musical, Best Actor (for John Lloyd Young as Frankie Valli), Best Featured Actor (for Christian Hoff as Tommy DeVito), and Best Lighting Design. There are currently three U.S. productions of Jersey Boys running outside New York and other productions overseas including productions in Toronto, London, Australia, South Africa and The Netherlands.

The movie adaptation, directed by Clint Eastwood, starred John Lloyd Young as Frankie Valli, Vincent Piazza as Tommy DeVito, Michael Lomenda as Nick Massi and Erich Bergen as Bob Gaudio. This film was released on June 20, 2014.

See also

Notes

References

External links

 
 
 
 Rock and Roll Hall of Fame page on the Four Seasons
 'The Four Seasons' Vocal Group Hall of Fame Page.
 "Jersey Boys", the Broadway Musical based on the life of Frankie Valli and the Four Seasons
 Bob Crewe radio tribute show – "Bob Crewe: The Master and the Music" – hosted by Ronnie Allen and starring 3 members of the Four Seasons plus 35 other music business professionals
 The Four Seasons in the UK – Enthusiasts and historical society site.
 The Man on the Beat: John Gilliland and The Pop Chronicles
 The Four Seasons on The Ed Sullivan Show
 The Four Seasons official home page

1960 establishments in New Jersey
American pop music groups
American rhythm and blues musical groups
American rock music groups
American soul musical groups
Jersey Shore musical groups
Motown artists
Musical backing groups
Musical groups established in 1960
Musical quartets
Musicians from New Jersey
Philips Records artists
Rock and roll music groups
Rock music groups from New Jersey
Vee-Jay Records artists
Warner Records artists